The MLW World Junior Heavyweight Championship was a professional wrestling junior heavyweight championship owned by the Major League Wrestling (MLW) promotion. Only wrestlers under the junior heavyweight weight-limit may hold the championship. The weight-limit for the tag team title is 205 lb (93 kg); it is assumed that this title has the same weight-limit.  It was proposed as part of a tournament called the J-Cup USA and  Sonjay Dutt won the tournament and also was the last champion. Only one reign was crowned over its one-year existence.

History
The title was unveiled at WarGames on September 19, 2003, Major League Wrestling would start an eight-man single-elimination tournament named the J-Cup USA to crown the first champion. Sonjay Dutt, Eddie Colón, Jimmy Yang and Christopher Daniels would advance to the semifinals. Dutt and Daniels would defeat Cólon and Yang, respectively to advance to the finals. Dutt then defeated Daniels to win the J-Cup USA and become the inaugural champion. The matches of the tournament aired later on Underground TV tapings between September 29 and October 27.

Inaugural Championship tournament

Reigns

References

External links
MLW World Junior Heavyweight Title History

Junior
World professional wrestling championships
Junior heavyweight wrestling championships